Eric Stomberg is an American bassoonist. He is visiting instructor of bassoon at Interlochen Arts Academy, and instructor of bassoon at the University of Kansas. Stomberg is a member of the chamber ensemble, City Music Cleveland. Formerly, Stomberg was a member of the ProMusica Chamber Orchestra, in Columbus, Ohio, and the Cincinnati Chamber Orchestra. Stomberg is serving as the Interim Director of Summer Music at Interlochen Arts Camp. He recorded music of Victor Bruns.

External links
Eric Stomberg Biography, University of Kansas
Eric Stomberg and Friends: Victor Bruns Music for Bassoon

Living people
American classical bassoonists
Interlochen summer faculty
Interlochen Arts Academy faculty
Year of birth missing (living people)